Molson Coors was created by the merger of two of North America's largest breweries: Molson of Canada,  and Coors of the United States, on February 9, 2005. Molson Coors acquired full ownership of the Miller brand portfolio from SABMiller in 2016. Through this acquisition and others, Molson Coors owns a number of notable beverage brands including Blue Moon, Carling, Coors Banquet, Coors Light, George Killian's Irish Red, Granville Island Brewing, Hamm's, Hop Valley, Leinenkugel's, Miller High Life, Miller Lite, Milwaukee's Best, Molson Canadian, Molson Export, Pilsner Urquell, Steel Reserve, and Terrapin.

Product availability and trademark registration vary by country. In certain countries, Molson Coors Beverage Company may distribute the products under license from a third party.

Molson Coors North America 

 Aguila
 Aquarelle
 Arnold Palmer Spiked Half & Half
 Atwater Brewing
 Bella Amari
 Black Horse
 Black Ice
 Blue Moon / Belgian Moon
 Blue Moon LightSky
 Bohemian
 Cape Line Sparkling Cocktails
 Carling
 Clearly Kombucha
 Colorado Native
 Winterfest
 Cool
 Coors
 Coors Banquet / Coors Original
 Coors Edge
 Coors Light
 Coors Organic
 Coors Seltzer
 Extra Gold Lager
 Creemore Springs
 Crispin Cider
 Cristal (Peru)
 Cusqueña
 Foster's
 George Killian's Irish Red
 Granville Island Brewing
 Hamm's
 Henry Weinhard's
 Henry Weinhard’s Gourmet Sodas
 Henry's Hard Soda
 Herman Joseph's Private Reserve
 Hop Valley
 India Beer
 Keystone
 Keystone Light
 Keystone Ice
 Laurentide
 Leinenkugel's
 Mad & Noisy
 Mad Jack
 Miller Brewing Company
 Icehouse
 Magnum
 Mickey's
 Miller Genuine Draft
 Miller High Life
 Miller Lite
 Miller64
 Milwaukee's Best
 Olde English 800
 Steel Reserve
 Molson
 Molson Canadian
 Molson Canadian Cold Shots
 Molson Dry
 Molson Exel
 Molson Export
 Molson Stock Ale
 Molson Ultra
 MOVO
 Old Style Pilsner
 Old Vienna
 Peroni
 Pilsner Urquell
 Red Dog
 Redd's
 Redd's Apple Ale/Redd's Hard Apple
 Redd's Wicked
 Revolver Brewing
 Rickards
 Saint Archer Brewing
 Saint Archer
 Saint Archer Gold
 Smith & Forge Hard Cider
 Sol Cerveza
 Sparks
 Standard Lager
 Terrapin Beer Company
 Vizzy Hard Seltzer
 Wanderoot

Molson Coors Europe 

 Apatinsko
 Aspall Cyder
 AstikA
 Astika Dark
 Astika Light
 Burgasko
 Barmen
 Bergenbier
 Bergenbier Non-Alcoholic
 Borsodi
 Caffreys
 Cobra Beer
 Franciscan Well
 Jelen
 Kamenitza
 Kamenitza Non-Alcoholic
 Lech Premium
 Madre
 Niksicko
 Noroc
 Ostravar
 Ozujsko
 Pardubice
 Pernstejn
 Porter
 Taxis
 Rekorderlig
 Sharp's Brewery
 Staropramen Brewery
 Pravha
 Staropramen
 Staropramen Non-Alcoholic
 Tomislav
 Tyskie Gronie
 Worthingtons
 WAI Moment (hard seltzer)

Discontinued 

 Aspen Edge
 Blair's Bavarian Beer
 Coors Malted Milk (non-alcoholic, formula later acquired by Mars Candy)
 Coors Red Light
 Coors Dry (western US only)
 Coors Artic Ice  
 Coors Cutter (non-alcoholic)
 Eisbock (seasonal - spring)
 Miller Fortune
 Miller Lite Ice
 Miller Gold
 Molson Canadian 67
 Screamers
 Southpaw Light
 Turbo 1000
 Weizenbier
 Zima

References

 
Molson